St Mary's Catholic Cemetery is located on Harrow Road, Kensal Green in London, England. It has its own Catholic chapel.

History
Established in 1858, the  site was built next door to Kensal Green Cemetery. It is the final resting place for more than 165,000 individuals of the Roman Catholic faith, and features a memorial to Belgian soldiers of the First World War, wounded in combat and evacuated to England, where they died in hospital.

There is also a War Memorial, in the form of a Cross of Sacrifice to the British, Irish, French, Czechoslovakian and Canadian servicemen. It is surrounded by a Screen Wall memorial and a low kerb listing Commonwealth service personnel of both World Wars whose graves in the cemetery could not be marked by headstones. In all, the cemetery contains 208 graves of Commonwealth service personnel of the First World War, and 107 graves of the Second World War. There are also many foreign nationality war graves that include, from First World War, 77 Belgians and six Germans, and from the Second, eight Czechoslovakian and six Polish war graves.

Many Irish migrants who came to England during the Great Famine are buried here.

Notable interments
Peter Ashmun Ames (1888–1920), British spy
Sir John Barbirolli (1899–1970), orchestral conductor
Marmaduke Barton (1865–1938), pianist and professor at the Royal College of Music
John Chippendall Montesquieu Bellew (1823-1874), Preacher, reciter, and author
Prince Louis Lucien Bonaparte (1813–1891), statesman, philologist
Frank Brangwyn (1867-1956), artist
Lizzie Burns (1827–1878), wife of Friedrich Engels
William Pitt Byrne (1806–1861), British newspaper editor and proprietor of The Morning Post
George Carman QC (1929–2001), barrister
General Sir John Cowans (1862–1921), Quartermaster-General to the Forces in World War I – buried at Terrace 130
Anne Crawford (1920-1956), actress of stage, radio and film
Major Thomas Crean (1873–1923), VC winner in Boer War
Frances C. Fairman (1839–1923), English animal painter and illustrator
James Grant (1822–1887), Scottish author, historian, artist and architect
Marcus Garvey (1887-1940), Jamaican political activist - initially buried in catacombs beneath the chapel, later reburied in King George VI Memorial Park, Kingston, Jamaica.
Gilbert Harding (1907–1960), journalist, radio and TV personality
Percy Hardy (1880-1916), first-class cricketer; committed suicide while serving during World War I.
Josef Jakobs (1898–1941), German spy – unmarked grave
Andrzej Kowerski (aka Andrew Kennedy) (1912–1988), decorated Polish soldier and spy
Danny La Rue (1927–2009), cabaret artist, nightclub owner, actor
Edmonia Lewis (1844–1907), sculptor
Father Vincent McNabb, O.P. (1868–1943), Irish scholar and priest
Henry Edward Manning (1808–1892), Cardinal Archbishop of Westminster (later transferred to Westminster Cathedral)
Alice Meynell (1847–1922), poet and essayist
Victoria Monks (1884–1927), music hall singer
The Lord Morris (1859–1935), Prime Minister of Newfoundland
Major General Sir Luke O'Connor (1831–1915), VC winner in Crimean War
T. P. O'Connor (1848–1929), Irish journalist and politician
Carlo Pellegrini (1839–1889), caricaturist
Sir Max Pemberton (1863–1950), British author, journalist and editor
Lieutenant Colonel James Henry Reynolds (1844–1932), VC winner and medical officer at Rorke's Drift
Sax Rohmer (1883–1959), author, creator of "Dr. Fu Manchu"
Mary Seacole (1805–1881) nurse, humanitarian
Krystyna Skarbek (aka Christine Granville) (1908–1952), Polish SOE agent and World War II heroine
Clarkson Frederick Stanfield (1793–1867), marine painter
Władysław Studnicki (1867–1953), Polish politician and publicist
Francis Thompson (1859–1907), poet, literary critic
Louis Wain (1860–1939), artist
Nicholas Wiseman (1802–1865), Cardinal Archbishop of Westminster (later transferred to Westminster Cathedral)

The chapel
 The cemetery's Catholic chapel is used for funeral and memorial services. The walls have many memorial plaques.
 The chapel was used in the filming of Miranda episode "Before I Die".

Access
The cemetery is open for visitors 365 days per year.

Summer Opening Hours
Monday to Saturday – 8am to 5pm
Sunday – 9am to 5pm

Winter Opening Hours
Monday to Saturday – 8am to 4pm
Sunday – 9am to 4pm

Christmas Day & Boxing Day – 9am to 1pm

The cemetery office

Office hours
Monday to Friday – 9am to 3pm
Visitors, especially those interested in their Catholic family history, may request the office staff consult the recently computerised records for all interments in St Mary's Catholic Cemetery (from 1858 to date).

Please note: The office is closed on Bank Holidays and Summer months closing times can vary. The Summer Opening Hours are in effect from early April to late October during UK British Summer Time. The Winter Opening Hours are for the rest of the year when the UK has Greenwich Mean Time.

References

External links
 Pastscape (English Heritage National Monuments record online)
 

Cemeteries in London
Roman Catholic cemeteries in England and Wales
Religion in the London Borough of Brent
Religious organizations established in 1858
Parks and open spaces in the London Borough of Brent
Catholic organizations established in the 19th century
1858 establishments in England
Commonwealth War Graves Commission cemeteries in England
Kensal Green